Alexandre "Alex" Fàbregas i Carné (born 25 October 1980 in Barcelona, Spain) is a former Spanish field hockey player who played for the Spain national team as midfielder. 

He finished in fourth position with the Men's National Team at the 2004 Summer Olympics in Athens, Greece. He was also part of the Spanish team that won the silver medal at the 2008 Summer Olympics. He played club hockey for Real Club de Polo in his hometown of Barcelona.

He was the target of death threats and insults on Twitter during the 2012 Olympic Games after stating that he played for Spain because he "had no other choice".

References

External links
 
 London 2012 profile
 Spanish Olympic Committee

1980 births
Living people
Spanish male field hockey players
Male field hockey midfielders
Olympic field hockey players of Spain
Field hockey players at the 2004 Summer Olympics
2006 Men's Hockey World Cup players
Field hockey players at the 2008 Summer Olympics
2010 Men's Hockey World Cup players
Field hockey players at the 2012 Summer Olympics
Olympic silver medalists for Spain
Olympic medalists in field hockey
Medalists at the 2008 Summer Olympics
Field hockey players from Barcelona
Real Club de Polo de Barcelona players